The Zeyn od-Din minaret is a historical minaret in Kashan, Iran. The founder of the minaret, Khaje Zeyn od-Din, was one of the dignitaries of the Timurid era in the 15th century. He also built a khanqah beside the minaret. It seems that minaret was originally 47 m high, but more than half of it was destroyed in 1931 by the decision of the governor and mayor of Kashan. Strong earthquakes during the centuries made the minaret lean.

See also
List of the historical structures in the Isfahan province

References 

Towers completed in the 15th century
Minarets in Iran
Buildings and structures in Kashan